Diphya is a genus of long-jawed orb-weavers that was first described by H. Nicolet in 1849. D. tanasevitchi and D. albulum were transferred from Lophomma in 2007.

Species
 it contains eighteen species, found in Asia, Africa, and South America:
Diphya albula (Paik, 1983) – Korea
Diphya bicolor Vellard, 1926 – Brazil
Diphya foordi Omelko, Marusik & Lyle, 2020 — South Africa
Diphya leroyorum Omelko, Marusik & Lyle, 2020 — South Africa
Diphya limbata Simon, 1896 – Chile, Argentina
Diphya macrophthalma Nicolet, 1849 (type) – Chile
Diphya okumae Tanikawa, 1995 – China, Korea, Japan
Diphya pumila Simon, 1889 – Madagascar
Diphya qianica Zhu, Song & Zhang, 2003 – China
Diphya rugosa Tullgren, 1902 – Chile
Diphya simoni Kauri, 1950 – South Africa
Diphya songi Wu & Yang, 2010 – China
Diphya spinifera Tullgren, 1902 – Chile
Diphya taiwanica Tanikawa, 1995 – Taiwan
Diphya tanasevitchi (Zhang, Zhang & Yu, 2003) – China
Diphya vanderwaltae Omelko, Marusik & Lyle, 2020 — South Africa
Diphya wesolowskae Omelko, Marusik & Lyle, 2020 — South Africa
Diphya wulingensis Yu, Zhang & Omelko, 2014 – China, Russia] (Far East)

In synonymy:
D. bilineata Tullgren, 1901 = Diphya limbata Simon, 1896 
D. brevipes Nicolet, 1849 = Diphya macrophthalma Nicolet, 1849 
D. crassipes Nicolet, 1849 = Diphya macrophthalma Nicolet, 1849 
D. longipes Nicolet, 1849 = Diphya macrophthalma Nicolet, 1849 
D. pallida Tullgren, 1902 = Diphya limbata Simon, 1896
D. tanikawai Marusik, 2017 = Diphya simoni Kauri, 1950

See also
 Lophomma
 List of Tetragnathidae species

References
''

Araneomorphae genera
Spiders of Africa
Spiders of Asia
Spiders of South America
Tetragnathidae